In Greek mythology, Leimon (Ancient Greek: Λειμὼν means 'meadow') was an Arcadian prince as the son of King Tegeates of Tegea and Maera, daughter of the Titan Atlas. He was the brother of Scephrus, Archedius, Gortys and Cydon.

Mythology 
When Apollo and Artemis visited the land of Tegea, Leimon suspected that his brother Scephrus plotted against him during a private conversation with the god. Leimon rushed on his brother and slayed him. To punish the murder of Scephrus, Artemis shot Leimon afterwards.

Notes

References 

 Pausanias, Description of Greece with an English Translation by W.H.S. Jones, Litt.D., and H.A. Ormerod, M.A., in 4 Volumes. Cambridge, MA, Harvard University Press; London, William Heinemann Ltd. 1918. . Online version at the Perseus Digital Library
 Pausanias, Graeciae Descriptio. 3 vols. Leipzig, Teubner. 1903.  Greek text available at the Perseus Digital Library.

Princes in Greek mythology
Arcadian characters in Greek mythology
Arcadian mythology
Tegea
Deeds of Apollo
Deeds of Artemis